Poshak class of barge were a series of self-propelled aviation fuel carriers built by Mazagon Dock Limited of the Indian navy.
The AVCAT tankers had carrying capacity of 400 tonnes.

Ships of the class

See also
 INS Poshak - A new fuel carrying barge delivered to the Indian Navy in 2012.

References

Auxiliary ships of the Indian Navy